The 2012 Penn Quakers football team represented the University of Pennsylvania in the 2012 NCAA Division I FCS football season. They were led by 21st-year head coach Al Bagnoli and played their home games at Franklin Field. They were a member of the Ivy League. They finished the season 6–4 overall 6–1 in Ivy League play to be crowned Ivy League champions. Penns average attendance for the season was 10,114 spectators.

Schedule

References

Penn
Penn Quakers football seasons
Ivy League football champion seasons
Penn Quakers football